Mate Pavić and Michael Venus were the defending champions, but Pavić chose to compete in Stuttgart instead. Venus played alongside André Sá, but lost to Łukasz Kubot and Marcelo Melo in the semifinals.

Kubot and Melo went on to win the title, defeating Raven Klaasen and Rajeev Ram in the final, 6–3, 6–4.

Seeds

Draw

Draw

References
 Main Draw

Ricoh Openandnbsp;- Doubles
2017 Doubles